Eurymesosa ventralis is a species of beetle in the family Cerambycidae. It was described Francis Polkinghorne Pascoe in 1865, originally under the genus Ereis. It is known from Java, Cambodia, Borneo, Malaysia and Vietnam.

Varietas
 Eurymesosa ventralis var. allapsa (Pascoe, 1866)
 Eurymesosa ventralis var. nigromaculata (Pic, 1932)

References

Mesosini
Beetles described in 1865